Jaakko Ilari Jonkka (12 February 1953 – 4 January 2022) was a Finnish jurist and the Chancellor of Justice of Finland from 2007 to 2017. He was preceded by Paavo Nikula and succeeded by Tuomas Pöysti.

Jonkka was an attorney, and worked previously at the University of Helsinki. He died on 4 January 2022, at the age of 68.

References

1953 births
2022 deaths
People from Lavia, Finland
Chancellors of Justice of Finland
20th-century Finnish lawyers
University of Turku alumni
Academic staff of the University of Helsinki